Beaumont is a municipality of about 2,900 people 10 km east of Lévis, next to the Saint Lawrence River, in the Bellechasse Regional County Municipality in the Chaudière-Appalaches region of Quebec. It is a mostly rural community, with most people working in Lévis as there are no major businesses in Beaumont. It was chosen as one of the top 20 nicest villages in the province of Quebec.

It is crossed by Route 132, with many of its shops and commodities built alongside it. A few small streets are attached to the road, but the rest of the municipality is divided using the seigneurial system. The many open fields in Beaumont stretch all the way to the Saint Lawrence river, giving the visitors a large panorama.

References

Municipalities in Quebec
Incorporated places in Chaudière-Appalaches
Canada geography articles needing translation from French Wikipedia